Rehearsing a Dream is a short documentary directed and produced by four time Oscar nominees Karen Goodman and Kirk Simon. Cinematography by Buddy Squires and Steve McCarthy, edited by Nancy Baker and a Production of Simon & Goodman Picture Company. The film premiered on HBO in August 2007 and was nominated for an Academy Award for Best Documentary Short.

The film follows a group of gifted 17-year-old performing and visual artists at the YoungArts program of the National Foundation for Advancement in the Arts in Miami. The young artists as spend a week learning from mentors like Mikhail Baryshnikov, Vanessa L. Williams, Jacques d'Amboise and Michael Tilson Thomas. The NFAA has for the past 27 years been helping the country's best high-school senior art students with their annual YoungArts Week in Miami and by scholarships. Over 7500 students apply for about 150 spots in all arts disciplines.

References

External links

2006 films
American short documentary films
2006 short documentary films
American independent films
2006 independent films
2000s English-language films
2000s American films